Deendayal Gupta (1909 – after 1957) was an Indian independence activist and politician affiliated with the Indian National Congress (INC), who was elected to the  Madhya Pradesh Legislative Assembly (Vidhan Sabha) in 1952. He served as Minister of Food  of Madhya Pradesh in the Ravishankar Shukla government. He also served as Food, Rehabilitation  & Social Welfare Minister of Bombay State from 1956 to 1957. In 1957, he was elected to the Maharashtra Legislative Assembly and served as its Vice President.

References

Indian independence activists
People from Madhya Pradesh
Indian National Congress politicians
Madhya Pradesh MLAs 1952–1957
Bombay State MLAs 1957–1960
Maharashtra MLAs 1960–1962
Bombay State politicians
1909 births
Date of death missing
Year of death missing
Indian National Congress politicians from Madhya Pradesh